The 1996 Kentucky Senate election took place on November 5, 1996. Part of the 1996 United States elections, Kentucky voters elected senators in 19 of the 38 Senate districts. Despite the Democratic Party maintaining a majority of 20 seats, five members of the Democratic Party joined all 18 Republicans to elect Larry Saunders President of the Senate. This gave Republicans effective control of the Senate for the first time since 1920.

Results by district

References

Notes 

Senate
Kentucky Senate elections
Kentucky Senate